You Are Here: A Come from Away Story is a 2018 Canadian documentary film, directed by Moze Mossanen, focusing on the role of Gander, Newfoundland and Labrador in helping international air travellers stranded after the closure of North American airspace due to the September 11 attacks. The film profiles some of the real people who were portrayed in the 2013 stage musical Come from Away.

The film premiered on HBO Canada and Crave on September 11, 2018, and was the channel's highest-rated broadcast of 2018. It received follow-up screenings at selected film festivals, winning the Audience Choice Award for Best Documentary at the Cinéfest Sudbury International Film Festival in Sudbury, Ontario.

Awards
At the 7th Canadian Screen Awards in 2019, the film won two Canadian Screen Awards, for Best Documentary Program and Best Editing in a Documentary Program (Cathy Gulkin), and received three other nominations for Best Visual Research (Elizabeth Klinck and Mike Lalonde), Best Music in a Non-Fiction Program or Series (Laurel MacDonald and Phil Strong) and Best Sound in a Non-Fiction Program or Series (Dave Rose, Christian Cooke, Colin McLellan, Dustin Harris, Steve Blair, Ian McGettigan, David Hocs).

References

External links
 
 

2018 television films
Canadian documentary television films
Films shot in Newfoundland and Labrador
Documentary films about the September 11 attacks
Documentary films about Canada
Gander, Newfoundland and Labrador
Works about Newfoundland and Labrador
2018 films
2010s Canadian films